Marija Radojičić (born 5 May 1992) is a Serbian football striker currently playing for Spartak in Serbia.

In Serbia she played for Masinac Nis, Napredak Kruševac, Spartak Subotica and ZFK Sloga Radnicki. She took part in the Champions League with both Masinac and Spartak. In 2013, she signed for Austrian champion SV Neulengbach, and in 2015 she moved to Iceland's Valur. Now, she plays for Fylkir, club from Iceland.
She is a member of the Serbian national team.

References

1992 births
Living people
Serbian women's footballers
Serbia women's international footballers
SV Neulengbach (women) players
Serbian expatriate footballers
Serbian expatriate sportspeople in Austria
Expatriate women's footballers in Austria
Expatriate women's footballers in Iceland
Women's association football forwards
ŽFK Spartak Subotica players
Marija Radojičić
ÖFB-Frauenliga players
ŽFK Mašinac PZP Niš players